The Tucker 48, commonly referred to as the Tucker Torpedo, was an automobile conceived by Preston Tucker while in Ypsilanti, Michigan and briefly produced in Chicago, Illinois in 1948. Only 51 cars were made including their prototype before the company was forced to declare bankruptcy and cease all operations on March 3, 1949, due to negative publicity initiated by the news media, a Securities and Exchange Commission investigation, and a heavily publicized stock fraud trial (in which the allegations were proven baseless and led to a full acquittal). Tucker suspected that the Big Three automakers and Michigan Senator Homer S. Ferguson had a role in the Tucker Corporation's demise.

The 48's original proposed price was said to be $1,000, but the actual selling price was closer to $4,000.

The 1988 movie Tucker: The Man and His Dream is based on the saga surrounding the car's production. The film's director, Francis Ford Coppola, is a Tucker owner and displays his vehicle on the grounds of his winery.

The Tucker 48 is often referred to as the Tucker Torpedo. However, the Torpedo was actually a prototype, and the name was never used for the production model, which was officially called the "Tucker 48".

Development 
After World War II, the public was ready for new car designs, but the Big Three Detroit automakers had not developed any new models since 1941 because their resources had been diverted towards producing war materiel. This provided opportunities for new, small automakers which could develop new cars faster than the huge legacy automakers. Studebaker was the first to introduce an all-new postwar model series in the ponton style which had just gone mainstream, but Tucker took a different track, designing a safe car with innovative features and modern styling. His specifications called for a water-cooled aluminum block flat-6 rear engine, disc brakes, four-wheel independent suspension, fuel injection, the location of all instruments within reach of the steering wheel, seat belts and a padded dashboard.

Before the war's end, Preston Tucker began working on plans for his new automobile. In the summer of 1944, he hired noted car designer George S. Lawson to style his new automobile. Lawson worked on the project for over a year and a half before his design debuted publicly, beginning about February 1946 and found as late as a year later in March 1947. Lawson was named the Tucker Corporation's "chief stylist" in February 1946, immediately upon the company's formation.

In December 1946, Lawson resigned from the company after a disagreement with Preston Tucker, and shortly thereafter, stylist Alex Tremulis of local Chicago design firm Tammen & Denison was hired and furthered the development of the Lawson design. Tucker gave Tammen & Denison and Tremulis a three-month contract, which expired in March 1947 and was not renewed. The culmination of Tremulis' efforts during this phase of design development was featured in a full-page advertisement run in numerous national newspapers in March 1947. Tremulis' design was based directly upon the work of George Lawson, but incorporated his own artistic flair.

Simultaneous with Tremulis' departure, Preston Tucker hired a team of five designers (Read Viemeister, Budd Steinhilber, Tucker Madawick, Hal Bergstrom and Phillip Egan) from the New York design firm J. Gordon Lippincott, who updated Tremulis' design just as Tremulis had done with Lawson's.

After a month's absence, Tremulis was rehired and the two independent design groups developed full-size clay models side by side in direct competition. Surviving photographs of the two models reveal that Tremulis' clay design remained unchanged from his March 1947 advertisement proposal and was not chosen for production. The passenger side of the Lippincott team's clay model (they submitted two designs), which incorporated the side profile developed by Tremulis prior to their arrival, was chosen virtually intact for the production automobile's styling.

The Tucker 48's evolving appearance in the company's press releases and other promotional materials, combined with suggestive statements such as "15 years of testing produced the car of the year"—despite no running prototype existing at the time—were instrumental in the SEC filing mail and conspiracy fraud charges against Preston Tucker. The SEC, however, failed to prove its case, and Tucker was acquitted of all charges in January 1950. However, the company never recovered.

Tremulis, like George Lawson, was eventually named the Tucker Corporation's "chief stylist," although the first reference to him holding this position does not appear until 1948, after the Tucker 48's exterior styling was completed.<ref>Tucker Topics," Tucker Corporation, 1948</ref>

The Tucker automobile was originally named the "Torpedo," but was changed to "Tucker '48" around the time of Lawson's departure and Tremulis' arrival, reportedly because Tucker did not want to remind the public of the horrors of World War II. Despite the name change, the Tucker 48 is still often referred to as the Tucker Torpedo. Alex Tremulis has claimed responsibility for dubbing the first prototype automobile the "Tin Goose," which is presently used in a loving manner but at the time was considered derogatory.

Innovative design features

The Tucker was a pioneer in terms of engineering and safety features. A rear engine, rear wheel drive configuration had been employed in Tatras and Volkswagens, and headlamps that turned with the front wheels had been available since the 1920s, but they would have been firsts for a modern American production car. The most recognizable feature of the Tucker 48, was a third directional headlamp. Centrally located, it would activate at steering angles of greater than 10 degrees to light the car's path around corners. At the time, 17 states had laws against cars having more than two headlights. Tucker fabricated a cover for the center light for use in these states.

The car had a rear engine and rear-wheel drive. A perimeter frame surrounded the vehicle for crash protection, as well as a roll bar integrated into the roof. The steering box was behind the front axle to protect the driver in a front-end accident. The instrument panel and all controls were within easy reach of the steering wheel, and the dashboard was padded for safety. The windshield was made of shatterproof glass and designed to pop out in a collision to protect occupants. The car's parking brake had a separate key so it could be locked in place to prevent theft. The doors extended into the roof, to ease entry and exit. Each Tucker that was built differed somewhat from the previous car, as each car built was basically a "prototype" where design features and engineering concepts were tried, improved, or discarded throughout the production cycle. The door releases on the interior of the Tucker came from the Lincoln Zephyr. The steering columns used in the Tucker were donated by Ford and are from the 1941 Lincoln. Preston Tucker held a patent for a collapsible steering column design. A glove box was added to the front door panels instead of the more conventional location in the dashboard to provide space for the "crash chamber" that the Tucker is now famous for. This is a padded area ahead of the passenger seat, free from obstructions, providing the front seat passengers an area to protect themselves in the event of an accident. The engine and transmission were mounted on a separate subframe which was secured with only six bolts. The entire drive train could thus be lowered and removed from the car in minutes. Tucker envisioned loaner engines being quickly swapped in for service in just 30 minutes.

Tucker envisioned several other innovations that were later abandoned. Magnesium wheels, disc brakes, fuel injection, self-sealing tubeless tires, and a direct-drive torque converter transmission were all evaluated or tested, but were dropped on the final prototype due to cost, engineering complexity, and lack of time to develop.

Tucker initially tried to develop an innovative engine, with help from Ben Parsons, then owner and president of the Fuelcharger Corporation, and would later be Tucker's VP of engineering. It was a  flat-6 cylinder with hemispherical combustion chambers, fuel injection, and overhead valves operated by oil pressure rather than a camshaft. An oil pressure distributor was mounted in line with the ignition distributor and delivered appropriately timed direct oil pressure to open each valve at proper intervals. The oil pressure fed to each valve was "timed" by intake and exhaust eccentrics and measured by spring-loaded plungers. It had large pistons built of aluminum and magnesium castings with steel-plated cylinder linings. This unique engine was designed to idle at 100 rpm and cruise at 250-1200 rpm through the use of direct-drive torque converters on each driving wheel instead of a transmission. These features would have been auto industry firsts in 1948, but as engine development proceeded, problems appeared. Six prototypes of the 589 engine were built, but it was installed only in the test chassis and the first prototype.

Troubled premiere
The world premiere of the much-hyped Tucker 48 car was set for June 19, 1947. Over 3,000 people showed up at the factory in Chicago for lunch, a train tour of the plant, and the unveiling of the first prototype. The unveiling appeared doomed, however, as last-minute problems cropped up. The night before the premiere, two of the prototype's independent suspension arms snapped under the car's weight. (The prototype was extremely heavy; much heavier than the other 48s.) Minor engine problems were fixed, and the car was presentable by the time of the premiere. However, the experimental 589 engine was extremely loud. Tucker told the band to play as loud as possible to drown out the noise. Additionally the high-voltage starter required the use of outside power to get the engine started, so Tucker had the engineering team keep the engine running during the entire event, fearing that the public would see how much effort was required to get the engine started. As the car was driven on to the platform, the liquid coolant boiled over and some steam escaped from the car, but no one seemed to notice.

Drew Pearson, one of the top newspaper columnists of his time, reported publicly that the car was a fraud because it could not go backward and it went "goose-geese" going down the road. Despite the fact that this problem was limited to the first prototype only, a symptom of the speed with which the first car was put together, the damage to the car's reputation was done, and a storm of negative media followed.

Tucker suffered another setback when his bids to obtain two steel mills to provide raw materials for his cars were rejected by the War Assets Administration under a shroud of questionable politics.

Continued development

 Engine 

Tucker had promised , but his innovative engine was not working out. The high oil pressure required a 24-volt electrical system, up to 60 volts to get it started, and a long cranking time at start-up. Additionally, the oil pressure required to maintain valve function was not achieved until the engine was turning at higher RPM and Tucker's engineers struggled with keeping the valve train working at idle and lower speeds/RPM. Having wasted nearly a year trying to make the 589 work, Tucker started looking for alternatives.

The company first tried the Lycoming aircraft engine, but it would not fit in the car's rear engine compartment.

An air-cooled flat-6 engine, the Franklin O-335 made by Air Cooled Motors (and originally intended for the Bell 47), fit, and its  pleased Tucker. He purchased four samples for $5,000 each, and his engineers converted the  engine to water cooling (a decision that has puzzled historians ever since). The Franklin engine was heavily modified by Tucker's engineers, including Eddie Offutt and Tucker's son Preston, Jr. at his Ypsilanti machine shop. Using an aircraft engine in an automotive application required significant modification; thus, very few parts of the original Franklin engine were retained in the final Tucker engine.

Tucker quickly bought Air Cooled Motors for $1.8 million to secure the engine source, then canceled all of the company's aircraft contracts so its resources could be focused on making automotive engines. This was a significant decision, since at the time of Tucker's purchase, Air Cooled Motors held over 65% of post-war U.S. aviation engine production contracts. The loss of income was substantial.

 Transmission 

With the horizontal, between-the-wheels 589 motor and its double torque converter(s) (and no reverse) drive system out, Tucker now needed a transmission to mate with the Franklin O-335. This motor was also horizontal, but its driveshaft pointed towards the front of the car. It was discovered, after a few sketches were made, that it was theoretically possible to adapt a previous transmission design intended for front-engine/front wheel drive use. This transmission served as a temporary "fix" for a very real problem for the success of the Tucker.

 Pre-Selector manual transmission 
It was discovered that the Cord 810/812's Auburn Gear, front-wheel-drive; 4-speed transmission, with the Bendix "Electric Hand" electro-vacuum shifting mechanism, fit the immediate design requirements needed to get the cars built, and on the road; until a future automatic (Tucker-built transmission) was worked out. This transmission was designed originally behind a standard V-8 engine, and pointed forward towards the front of the car, for the front wheels. However, this transmission came with a poor reputation, following its original use, in the Cord 810 automobile. (In 1936, when the Cord 810 made its debut at the New York Automobile show, the transmissions were so problematic that 810 models were mostly shown without any transmission installed. Problems abounded until the last Cord was produced in 1937.) The Cord transmissions, even with refurbishing, were initially inadequate for the power and torque of the O-335 engine. The Cords lacked adequate lubrication and the main shaft was so long that it warped under load (causing gears to pop out of play), and the gear-teeth were quite weak. Nevertheless, in the Tucker, this transmission worked well enough for the new engine configuration; it provided an adequate (albeit fragile) transmission, with a reverse gear. The company then sent several of its staff, including Preston Tucker Jr., on a campaign to buy used Cord transmissions, for reconditioning; a total of 22 used transmissions were acquired from junkyards and used car dealers. These transmissions were taken to the Ypsilanti Machine And Tool Company. After refurbishment, several were mated to the O-335 and found to work, providing four speeds forward and reverse. It was decided, consequently, that the Cord design - nearly 12 years old - would become the "manual transmission" for the 1948 and subsequent Tucker automobiles. About 18 of the 22 Cords were found to be usable and – since newly made Y-1 transmissions were not yet available – were installed in production Tucker vehicles. Several of the cars have survived with Cord transmissions.

 Ypsilanti Y-1 transmission 
Ypsilanti Machine and Tool Company, which was tapped to recondition the Cord units, began immediately redesigning the transmission for mass production for Tucker. This new design, which had few similar parts to the Cord transmission, still used the same basic indirect transmission design, but had all new gearing, shafts and electro-vacuum controls. Tucker and his engineers modified it, installing stronger gears and lengthening the case. The modified Cord transmission was named the Tucker Y-1 (Ypsilanti-1) and was installed in a few Tuckers. Both also used a Bendix designed electric vacuum shift mechanism with no mechanical linkage to the steering column shift lever. These EVS's had problems of their own with electrical connections and vacuum leaks that hindered shifting, so a new fully mechanical shift design would have been needed, had the Tucker made it into 1949.

 Tuckermatic drive 

To solve the transmission problems with a new final transmission design, Warren Rice, creator of the Buick Dynaflow transmission, was consulted. A unique continuously variable transmission called the "Tuckermatic" was designed, which was strong enough to handle the Franklin O-335's power and torque. It was a simple but effective design with a single, rear-mounted torque converter and only 27 basic moving parts which was about 90 fewer than normally required for a contemporary automatic. The variable pitch torque converter allowed a continuously variable drive ratio with two forward gears and one reverse gear. 

The only surviving car with a Tuckermatic installed had a standard column shift lever, with a three position quadrant on the steering column. Up was reverse, the middle was neutral, and down was drive. Due to the Tuckermatic's design, no lower gear selections were necessary, hence there was no need for a multi gated selector like other automatics.

Three versions of the Tuckermatic were made: the R-1, R-1-2, and R-3 (R for Warren Rice, its designer). The first version, the R-1, was not installed on any of the final cars. It required the engine to be off in order to select a gear. The R-1-2 was improved by adding a layshaft brake to allow gear selection while the engine was running. This version was installed on cars #1026 and 1042 only. The R-3 version had further improvements including a centrifugal clutch to help shifting between forward and reverse even further, and may have been destined for car #1048 for further testing.

Because the external torque converter on the Tuckermatic made the engine-transmission unit longer, the fuel tank in the Tucker 48 had to be moved from behind the rear seat to in front of the dashboard for all Tuckers from car #1026 forward, even though only two of them actually had the Tuckermatic installed. This had the added advantage of improving weight distribution in the car.

 Other drives contemplated for the Tucker 48 
A Borg-Warner based, 3-speed automatic was supposedly tested and was installed on car #1048 at some point when the company was in business, although no histories written ever mentioned such a drive. That said, Tucker ultimately wanted to design his own transmission for the final car, which came to fruition with the Tuckermatic. In 1949, #1048 was sold at the receivership auction without a transmission installed. Today, #1048 has the 4 speed pre-selector transmission that was used on all but two of the original 50 pilot models. It is likely this transmission was privately installed after the auction, and that the unit was the Ypsilanti-built Y-1 transmission.

Suspension and body

Suspension designs, especially the front suspension, had to be changed throughout development. Rather than steel springs, Tucker used an elastomeric (rubber) 4-wheel independent suspension similar to what was used on the race cars he developed with Harry Miller at the Indianapolis 500. The rubber elastomers were developed with assistance from the Firestone Tire Company and used a special vulcanization process to produce a specific spring rate.

Tucker's suspension designs were plagued with severe stiffness throughout development, which, while good for handling, caused front-wheel corner lift when cornering on uneven surfaces. The test bed and the prototype had a double-rubber disc type front and rear suspension, similar to Miller's race cars, which was too weak for the weight of a passenger car. On cars #1001 and 1002 the rear wheels could not be removed without removing the fender or suspension due to the stiffness of the suspension and the rear wheel arch fender design. From car #1003 on, the rear fender shape was changed so the tire could be removed easily. Aside from the fender changes, the rear suspension remained the same from car #1001 on.

Three versions of the front suspension were installed in the cars (aside from the rubber-disc style used on the prototype). Cars #1001–1002 used a rubber torsion tube design, which suffered from severe toe-in during heavy braking. Tucker then switched to a rubber sandwich type suspension (with a rubber block sandwiched between the upper and lower A-arms) on cars #1003–1025, however, this type was severely stiff. Starting on car #1026, Tucker finally settled on a suspension design with a modified version of the rubber torsion tube with the toe-in braking problem corrected.

Original Tucker paint color codes:
 100: Black
 200: Waltz Blue
 300: Green
 400: Beige
 500: Grey (Silver)
 600: Maroon

Original Tucker interior trim color codes:
 900: Green
 920: Blue
 940: Beige

Funding and publicity
Having raised $17,000,000 in a stock issue, one of the first speculative IPOs, Tucker needed more money to continue development of the car. He sold dealerships and distributorships throughout the country. Another money maker was the Tucker Accessories Program. In order to secure a spot on the Tucker waiting list, future buyers could purchase accessories, like seat covers, radio, and luggage, before their car was built. This brought in an additional $2,000,000.

With the final design in place, Preston Tucker took the pre-production cars on the road to show them in towns across the country. The cars were an instant success, with crowds gathering wherever they stopped. One report says Tucker was pulled over by a police officer intent on getting a better look at the car.

To prove the road-worthiness of his cars, Tucker and his engineers ran several cars at the Indianapolis Motor Speedway in several endurance tests. During this testing, car #1027 was rolled three times at 95 miles per hour (153 km/h), and the driver (chief mechanic Eddie Offutt) walked away with just bruises. During the crash, the windshield popped out as designed, verifying Tucker's safety features were effective. Afterwards, upon replacing a damaged tire, the car started up and was driven off the track.

 SEC investigation and demise 

One of Tucker's most innovative business ideas caused trouble for the company. His Accessories Program raised funds by selling accessories before the car was even in production. After the war, demand for new cars was greater than dealers could supply, and most dealers had waiting lists for new cars. Preference was given to returning veterans, which meant that non-veterans were bumped down on the waiting lists indefinitely. Tucker's program allowed potential buyers that purchased Tucker accessories to obtain a guaranteed spot on the Tucker dealer waiting list for a Tucker 48 car.

This concept was investigated by the U.S. Securities and Exchange Commission and the United States Attorney, and led to an indictment of company executives. Although all charges were eventually dropped, the negative publicity destroyed the company and halted production of the car.

 Tucker 48 cars 

The first Tucker produced was a prototype sedan, known as the "Tin Goose". 58 frames and bodies were built at the factory. From these parts, 36 sedans were finished before the factory was closed. After the factory closed, but before liquidation of his assets, Tucker retained a core of employees who assembled an additional 14 sedans, for a total of 50. A 51st car was partially completed. A few of the remaining frames and bodies were built into complete cars specifically #1052 and #1057 (the 1949 prototype with design changes), but the fate of the others is unknown.

In the early 1950s, Ft. Lauderdale, Florida, fairgrounds owner Nick Jenin purchased over ten Tuckers, the original Tucker testbed chassis, numerous Tucker parts, photos and documents. He developed a traveling display called "The Fabulous Tuckers". He hauled the cars and memorabilia around the country for nearly 10 years displaying them at fairgrounds and car shows. His display highlighted the questionable policies and SEC fraud investigation which brought Tucker down.

When the cars appear at auction, which is rare, they command prices attained by only a few marquee cars. In August 2010, Tucker #1045 sold for $1.127 million, while Tucker #1043 went for $2.915 million at an auction in 2012.

 Replica vehicles 
In 1997, Rob Ida Automotive started work on a replica of the Tucker 48, which culminated in the release and marketing of the 2001 Ida Automotive New Tucker 48. This replica faithfully recreates the Tucker's external bodywork, but is built on a hotrod chassis with resin-infused plastic body panels. The paint and wheels reflect modern hotrod styling, and the interior is fully modernized. It is powered by a mid-mounted Cadillac Northstar V8. Ida has built three Tucker replicas.

NASCAR

Tucker #1004 was briefly raced in the NASCAR Grand National series in the early 1950s.

 See also 
 Tucker: The Man and His Dream''
 List of defunct United States automobile manufacturers

References

External links

 TuckerClub.org Official Tucker Automobile Club of America Website - Information about the cars, including the locations of all extant examples
 www.htmgv.org Henry Ford Museum Tucker Exhibit
 RobIdaConcepts.com The Ida Automotive New Tucker 48 and Lower 48
 Tucker 48 Jalopnik Fantasy Garage
 Tucker Torpedo Automobile 1948 3D model of the Tucker
 Antique Automobile Club thread about the auction of Tucker #1010
Short lived/Odd vehicle collection from Chuck's Toyland
Huntsville Rewound feature about Keller Automobiles (18 made/3 exist)

1948 establishments in the United States
Motor vehicle manufacturers based in Illinois
Cars powered by boxer engines
Cars powered by aircraft engines
Cars introduced in 1948
First car made by manufacturer
Rear-engined vehicles
Cars powered by rear-mounted 6-cylinder engines
1940s cars